Sir Henry William Peek, 1st Baronet DL (26 February 1825 – 26 August 1898) was an importer of spices, tea and other groceries, philanthropist and Conservative Member of Parliament (MP).

Parents, marriage and residence

Peek was born in 1825 to James Peek of Watcombe, Torquay, Devon and Elizabeth, his first wife.

He married in 1848, Margaret Maria (d 1884), second daughter of William Edgar of Clapham Common, Surrey.

It was probably built about the middle of the 18th century. It housed Louis Joseph, Prince of Condé in some of his final years (died 1818), MP Joseph Marryat then after a time Peek. It was demolished about 1900-1902 passing to a building syndicate.

Political work
At the 1865 general election he was an unsuccessful candidate in the Eastern division of Surrey but a new dual-member constituency was created along its western belt (Mid Surrey) under the Second Reform Act, where he was elected in 1868 MP.  He was re-elected in his seat until his resignation in 1884.
Hansard shows he made 93 speeches or questions in Parliament, from 1869 to 1884, contributing in each year.

Title and legacy

He was made a baronet on 13 May 1874, of Rousdon in the County of Devon.

His son in turn died in 1927, with assets of £172,685 and the baronetcy reached the fifth generation in 2004.

In Surrey Cranleigh's old Peek Institute was founded by Peek in memory of his late wife, namely a club, with reading and billiard rooms, and a library.

References

External links 
 

1825 births
1898 deaths
Conservative Party (UK) MPs for English constituencies
Deputy Lieutenants of Devon
UK MPs 1868–1874
UK MPs 1874–1880
UK MPs 1880–1885
Baronets in the Baronetage of the United Kingdom